Mariana Duque Mariño was the defending champion, but she lost to Han Xinyun in the first round.
7th seed Lourdes Domínguez Lino defeated Mathilde Johansson 2–6, 6–3, 6–2 in the final.

Seeds

Qualifying

Draw

Finals

Top half

Bottom half

References
 Main Draw
 Qualifying Draw

Copa Sony Ericsson Colsanitas - Singles
2011 Singles